Kindness is a type of behaviour

Kindness may also refer to:
 Kindness (musician), stage name of Adam Bainbridge
 Smokie (band), called Kindness between 1970 and 1974
 Life Vest Inside, Global Kindness Organization
 "Kindness", a song by Brett Kissel from the 2021 album What Is Life?

Kindness is also a family name, originally from North East Scotland. People commonly known by their family name Kindness include:
 Tom Kindness (1929–2004), member of the United States House of Representatives
 John Kindness (born 1951), Irish multi-media artist

See also
Kind (disambiguation)